Our Lady of Assumption College (informally referred to as OLAC) is a private non-sectarian school which is located at RSBS Blvd., San Lorenzo South, Malitlit, Santa Rosa City, Laguna, Philippines. Contact No. (049) 837-83-71.

History
After five years of operation at Our Lady of Assumption College - (Main Campus), its founders decided to put up another school and give way to the birth of OLAC Santa Rosa, offering a complete program from Pre-Elementary to High School.

In April 2006, the West wing of the school was demolished to give way to the construction of a new building.  It was formally opened last June 2007.

Location
OLAC Santa Rosa is located at Phase 1, Main Road, RSBS Blvd., San Lorenzo South, Malitlit, Santa Rosa City, Laguna.

Courses offered
 K to 12

Facilities
 Science Laboratory
 Computer Laboratory
 Speech Laboratory
 Audio-Visual Room
 Library
 Mini-Chapel
 Basketball Court
 Playground

Gallery

Other branches
 OLAC San Pedro - Main Campus (Villa Olympia Subd., San Pedro, Laguna)
 OLAC Cabuyao (Mabuhay City Phase 2 & Phase 6, Mamatid, Cabuyao, Laguna)
 OLAC Tanauan (N. Gonzales Street, Poblacion II, Tanauan, Batangas)

References
 OLAC Handbook

High schools in Laguna (province)
Private schools in the Philippines
Education in Santa Rosa, Laguna
Universities and colleges in Laguna (province)